Kakhi Kavsadze ( K’akhi K’avsadze; June 5, 1935 – April 27, 2021) was a Georgian and Soviet film, television and stage actor.

Early life 
He was born in Tbilisi. After his birth, his parents moved to Tkibuli. His father David Kavsadze was a choirleader who, while serving in the Red Army during World War II, was taken prisoner, led a choir in the prison camp, and helped to save the lives of many Georgian prisoners, but after the war was charged with treason and exiled to Sverdlovsk Oblast.

Kakhi Kavsadze graduated in 1959 from the Shota Rustaveli Theatre and Film University and the Rustaveli Theatre.

Career 
Kavsadze made his debut in cinema in the 1950s. He was awarded the title of People’s Artist (1981) and won the Festival Prize at Dushanbe (1989).

His notable roles include Adam (Divine Comedy), Tavadi Kotsia (Gushindelni), Devdariani (Sabraldebo daskvna), Iliko (Me, Grandma, Iliko and Ilarion), Simon Chachava (The Caucasian Chalk Circle), Lord (Richard III), Kent (King Lear) and Rasputin (Kvachi Kvachantiradze).

He died of complications from COVID-19 in Tbilisi at the age of 85.

Selected filmography

References

External links
 
 Actor in Rustaveli theatre

1935 births
2021 deaths
Actors from Tbilisi
20th-century male actors from Georgia (country)
Male film actors from Georgia (country)
Russian male film actors
Soviet male film actors
People's Artists of Georgia
21st-century male actors from Georgia (country)
Communist Party of the Soviet Union members
Deaths from the COVID-19 pandemic in Georgia (country)